The 2021 U.S. National Gymnastics Championships was the 57th edition of the U.S. National Gymnastics Championships. The competition, superintended at Dickies Arena in Fort Worth, Texas, concluded on June 6, 2021.

Competition schedule and media 
The competition featured Senior and Junior contests for both women's and men's disciplines. The preliminary competition schedule was as follows (in central standard time):

 Thursday, June 3: Men's gymnastics – 1:00 p.m., juniors, and 6:30 p.m., seniors
 Friday, June 4: Women's gymnastics – 1:00 p.m., juniors, and 6:30 p.m., seniors
 Saturday, June 5: Men's gymnastics – 1:00 p.m., juniors, and 6:30 p.m., seniors
 Sunday, June 6: Women's gymnastics – 12:00 p.m., juniors, and 5:30 p.m., seniors
The event was broadcast on NBC Sports.

Medalists 
The results for Junior men's was partitioned out into two age categories: 15-16 and 17-18. 

Simone Biles was the AA Champion of the Year for the third year in a row, while Brody Malone clinched his first award over incumbent and previous title holders Mikulak and Muldauer.

Results

Women

Senior

Junior

Men

Senior

Women's National Team 
The top six women automatically qualified to the national team: Simone Biles, Sunisa Lee, Jordan Chiles, Emma Malabuyo, Leanne Wong, and Jade Carey.  The selection committee also added the women who finished 7th–17th to the national team: Grace McCallum, Skye Blakely, MyKayla Skinner, Kara Eaker, Kayla DiCello, Shilese Jones, Emily Lee, Amari Drayton, Ava Siegfeldt, Addison Fatta, and Zoe Miller. Riley McCusker, who only competed on the uneven bars and finished second, was also added. All 18 national team members qualified to compete at the upcoming Olympic Trials.

The top six junior competitors who automatically qualified to the national team were Katelyn Jong, Madray Johnson, Kaliya Lincoln, Joscelyn Roberson, Kailin Chio, and Charlotte Booth. Additionally, co-7th place finishers Ella Kate Parker, Gabriella Van Frayen, and Avery King were also added to the national team. Jong, Johnson, Lincoln, and Chio were selected to compete at the upcoming Junior Pan American Championships with Roberson as the alternate.

Men's National Team 
The five men who competed at the Pan American Championships (held the same weekend as the National Championships) were automatically added to the senior National Team: Cameron Bock, Vitaliy Guimaraes, Paul Juda, Riley Loos, and Donnell Whittenburg.

At the conclusion of the competition 12 athletes were automatically named to the senior National Team: Allan Bower, Brandon Briones, Alex Diab, Gage Dyer, Ian Gunther, Brody Malone, Sam Mikulak, Akash Modi, Yul Moldauer, Stephen Nedoroscik, Eddie Penev, and Shane Wiskus.  The Men's Program Committee named an additional three athletes to the team after accepting petitions submitted by the athletes: Robert Neff, Matt Wenske, and Alec Yoder.  Also selected was the inaugural Senior Development Team: Taylor Burkhart, Dallas Hale, Joseph Pepe, Colt Walker, and Khoi Young.

The top-three 15, 16, and 17-year-old athletes automatically qualified to the Junior Men’s National Team: Xander Hong, Toby Liang, Caleb Melton, Alexandru Nitache, Cole Partridge, Vahe Petrosyan, Fred Richard, Kai Uemura, and Ignacio Yockers.  The Men's Program Committee named an additional five athletes to the junior men's national team: Landen Blixt, Caden Clinton, Asher Hong, Toma Murakawa, and David Shamah.

Participants 
The following individuals participated in the women's competition:

Seniors

 Ciena Alipio – San Jose, California (Midwest Gymnastics)
 Sydney Barros – Lewisville, Texas (World Champions Centre)
 Simone Biles – Spring, Texas (World Champions Centre)
 Skye Blakely – Frisco, Texas (WOGA)
 Jade Carey – Phoenix, Arizona (Arizona Sunrays)
 Jordan Chiles – Spring, Texas (World Champions Centre)
 Kayla DiCello – Boyds, Maryland (Hill's Gymnastics)
 Amari Drayton – Spring, Texas (World Champions Centre)
 Kara Eaker – Grain Valley, Missouri (GAGE)
 Addison Fatta – Wrightsville, Pennsylvania (Prestige)
 Aleah Finnegan – Lee's Summit, Missouri (GAGE)
 eMjae Frazier – Erial, New Jersey (Parkettes)
 Laurie Hernandez – Old Bridge, New Jersey (Gym-Max)
 Morgan Hurd – Middletown, Delaware (First State)
 Karis German – Spring, Texas (World Champions Center)
 Shilese Jones – Westerville, Ohio (Future Gymnastics Academy)
 Emily Lee – Los Gatos, California (West Valley Gymnastics School)
 Sunisa Lee – St. Paul, Minnesota (Midwest Gymnastics Center)
 Emma Malabuyo – Flower Mound, Texas (Texas Dreams)
 Grace McCallum – Isanti, Minnesota (Twin City Twisters)
 
 Riley McCusker – Brielle, New Jersey (Arizona Sunrays)
 Chellsie Memmel – Dousman, Wisconsin (M and M Gymnastics)
 Zoe Miller – Spring, Texas (World Champions Centre)
 Kaylen Morgan – Huntersville, North Carolina (Everest)
 Katelyn Rosen – Boerne, Texas (Mavericks at Artemovs)
 Ava Siegfeldt – Hampton, Virginia (World Class Gymnastics)
 Lyden Saltness – Forest Lake, Minnesota (Midwest Gymnastics)
 MyKayla Skinner – Gilbert, Arizona (Desert Lights Gymnastics)
 
 Leanne Wong – Overland Park, Kansas (GAGE)

Juniors

 Charlotte Booth – Clermont, Florida (Brandy Johnson's)
 Kailin Chio – Henderson, Nevada (Gymcats)
 Madray Johnson – Dallas, Texas (WOGA)
 Katelyn Jong – Allen, Texas (Metroplex Gymnastics)
 
 Avery King – Dallas, Texas (WOGA)
 Kaliya Lincoln – Frisco, Texas (WOGA)
 Nola Matthews – Gilroy, California (Airborne Gymnastics)
 Ella Murphy – Frisco, Texas (WOGA)
 Ella Kate Parker – West Chester, Ohio (Cincinnati Gymnastics)
 Azaraya Ra-Akbar – Columbia, Maryland (World Class)
 Joscelyn Roberson – Texarkana, Texas (North East Texas Elite)
 Izzy Stassi – North Royalton, Ohio (Gym X-Treme)
 Gabriella Van Frayen – Lewis Center, Ohio (Gym X-Treme)

References 

U.S. National Gymnastics Championships
Gymnastics in Texas
Sports competitions in Fort Worth, Texas
U.S. Open
U.S. Open
U.S. Open
2020s in Fort Worth, Texas